Kılıçkaya is a village in the Erzincan District, Erzincan Province, Turkey. The village is populated by Kurds of the Keçelan tribe and had a population of 99 in 2021. The hamlets of Alişir, Fındık, Ocaklı and Sarıdana are attached to the village.

References 

Villages in Erzincan District
Kurdish settlements in Erzincan Province